Annick Mahnert (born 1975, Geneva) is a film festival curator and film producer. She is the director of programming at Fantastic Fest, programs the Sitges International Fantastic Film Festival, and has been named executive director of the Canadian genre industry platform Frontières.

Life and work

Annick Mahnert studied film production at the NYFA and worked as a production assistant at Roger Corman's Concorde-New Horizons. Back in her native Switzerland, she went on to work in distribution and programming at 20th Century Fox, Warner Bros., Pathé Cinémas, and Frenetic Films. She worked at Maximage Filmproduktion as a production assistant. In 2012 she moved to Paris to join Celluloid Dreams, handling sales and acquisitions. Since 2013, she is working as a freelance producer, acquisitions consultant, and festival programmer and was hired in November 2013 as Foreign Representative for the Market & Festivals department at Swiss Films, the promotion agency for Swiss filmmaking.

Mahnert is a programmer at the Sitges International Fantastic Film Festival, and the head of programming at Fantastic Fest in Austin.
 In April 2020, Mahnert became the executive director at the Frontières Co-Production Market, an industry initiative for genre film professionals.

She is a consultant for the Austrian Film Institute, the Zurich Film Foundation, the Cineforom in Geneva, and co-founded the European Genre Forum.

As a film producer she worked on Mattie Do's The Long Walk (2019), Alexandre O. Philippe's documentaries 78/52: Hitchcock's Shower Scene (2017) and Memory: The Origins of Alien (2019), and other productions.

In 2022, she was selected as jury member in the Filmmakers of the Present competition category at 75th Locarno Film Festival.

References

External links 

 

1975 births
Living people
Swiss women curators
Swiss women film producers